Culpepper's Cannon is the third novel in the Culpepper Adventures series by Gary Paulsen. It is about Dunc Culpepper and Amos who are researching the Civil War cannon in the town square, until they uncover a hidden note inside the cannon which tells about a time portal. It was published on July 1, 1992 by Dell Publishing.

Novels by Gary Paulsen
1992 American novels
Novels about time travel